Rakesh Pandey (born 14 August 1952) is an Indian politician and a member of the 18th Uttar Pradesh Assembly from Jalalpur as a Samajwadi Party candidate. He was a Member of Parliament in the 15th Lok Sabha from Ambedkar Nagar as a Bahujan Samaj Party (BSP) candidate. From 2002 to 2007, he was a MLA in the Uttar Pradesh Legislative Assembly. In January 2022, Pandey left Bahujan Samaj Party and joined Samajwadi Party.

Personal life
Pandey was born in Kotwa Mohamadpur in Ambedkar Nagar district of Uttar Pradesh to Jagmohan Pandey and Raghuraji Devi. He studied till matriculation and is an agriculturalist by profession. Pandey married Manju Pandey on 29 June 1971. They have two sons. His younger son, Ritesh Pandey is an MP from the Ambedkar Nagar constituency. His older son, Ashish Pandey is a Lucknow based real estate businessman.

Political career
Pandey was a member in the Uttar Pradesh Legislative Assembly from 2002 to 2007. As a Bahujan Samaj Party politician, he was a Member of Parliament in the 15th Lok Sabha from Ambedkar Nagar from 2007 to 2014.

In January 2022, Pandey left Bahujan Samaj Party and joined Samajwadi Party. Subsequently, Pandey won from the Jalalpur constituency in the 2022 Uttar Pradesh Legislative Assembly election, defeating Bahujan Samaj Party's Rajesh Singh by a margin of 13,630 votes.

References

1952 births
Living people
India MPs 2009–2014
Bahujan Samaj Party politicians from Uttar Pradesh
People from Ambedkar Nagar district
Uttar Pradesh MLAs 2002–2007
Uttar Pradesh MLAs 2022–2027